Michael Jakobsen (born 2 January 1986) is a Danish professional footballer who plays as a defender for National Premier Leagues South Australia club Adelaide Olympic. He was named 2002 Danish Under-17 Player of the Year, and has played five games for the Denmark national team.

Club career

B.93 and PSV 
Jakobsen started playing football with Boldklubben 1908 and Boldklubben af 1893 in the Danish 1st Division. He made his senior debut for B.93, and after a year at the club, Dutch team PSV Eindhoven spotted Jakobsen and signed him into their youth academy in 2003. Jakobsen would appear in just one first team match for PSV, playing for 10 minutes.

Aalborg BK 
Jakobsen left PSV in February 2005, and returned to Denmark. He signed a contract with Aalborg BK, playing the second half of the 2004–05 Danish Superliga season. Jakobsen made his debut on 13 March 2005, in a 1–1 draw against Brøndby. He proved himself a solid defender with good passing, and played all remaining 15 Superliga games for AaB. After nine months at AaB, he signed a much-improved contract, running until December 2009.

In the 2006–07 Danish Superliga season, Jakobsen played 32 of 33 games, as AaB placed third in the league, their best result in eight years. During the 2006–07 season, Jakobsen scored the first brace of his career in a 4–0 win over Vejle Boldklub on 30 July 2006. The following 2007–08 Danish Superliga season, he played a vital part in the AaB squad that ended up champions, finishing nine points clear of FC Midtjylland.

Jacobsen's performances for AaB in the 2007–08 UEFA Champions League campaign, including a goal in the 2–2 draw with Manchester United, brought him to the attention of several clubs from both the Premier League and Bundesliga, but in December 2008, he chose to extend his AaB contract until June 2012.

UD Almería 
In July 2010, it was announced that La Liga club UD Almería bought Jakobsen from Aalborg BK, with Jacobsen signing a 5-year deal. However, in August 2010, Aalborg BK CEO Poul Sørensen announced that the deal was actually a one-year loan with an option to buy once the loan period had ended. Jakobsen made his Almería debut in a 0–0 draw against Osasuna in the opening game of the season on 29 August 2010. After another appearance against Espanyol, Jakobsen didn't feature in another La Liga game for two months. He would, after his return to the first team, feature more regularly in the squad. On 1 May 2011, Jakobsen received a straight red card in a 1–1 draw against Sevilla Almería was relegated to the Segunda División in 2010–11, after four years in La Liga. Almería would exercise their option to buy Jakobsen from Aalborg BK following the season meaning he would remain in Spain for the upcoming year. In the 2011–12 season, Jakobsen was increasingly used in the first team, but Almerîa were unable to earn promotion to La Liga. On 10 September 2011, Jakobsen scored the first goal of his Spanish career in a 2–0 win over Real Murcia.

FC Copenhagen 
In August 2012, Almería announced that Jakobsen would transfer to Copenhagen after he passed medical tests in Copenhagen. On 25 August 2012, Jakobsen made his debut, playing as a centre back, in a 3–2 win over Randers.

Esbjerg fB 
After a brief loan at FC Nordsjælland while with FC Copenhagen, Jakobsen was signed by another Danish top-flight club, Esbjerg fB, in 2014. Jakobsen would go on to play over 50 senior matches for Esbjerg FC, although he would go out on loan to Norwegian club Lillestrøm SK in early 2016.

Melbourne City
In September 2016, Jakobsen was signed by A-League club Melbourne City. He joined the club as a designated visa player.

Jakobsen scored his first goal for Melbourne City on his debut, a bicycle kick in the second minute of the 2016 FFA Cup quarter final against Western Sydney Wanderers. He was appointed the club's on-field captain ahead of the 2017/18 season.

Adelaide United 
On 14 May 2018, Jakobsen was released by Melbourne City and he signed a 2-year deal with Adelaide United.

NorthEast United
On 8 September 2022, he signed for Indian Super League side NorthEast United.

He was named as captain of  NorthEast United for the 2022–23 Indian Super League season. On 8 October 2022, he made his debut for the club in their controversial 1–0 away defeat to Bengaluru.

Adelaide Olympic
Jakobsen signed ahead of the 2023 National Premier Leagues South Australia season with Adelaide Olympic.

International career 
While at B 93, Jakobsen played a number of games for various Danish youth national teams, winning the 2002 Danish Under-17 Player of the Year award. He played a combined total of 72 youth national team matches, scoring 10 goals, for the Danish youth selections until October 2008.

While at PSV, he was dropped from the Danish under-19 football team in May 2004. After his move to AaB, he was once more called up for the Danish national youth teams, and made his debut for the Danish under-21 national team in June 2005. In May 2006, he was selected for the Denmark under-21 national team to compete at the 2006 European Under-21 Championship. He played in Denmark's three matches, before they were eliminated from the tournament.

In March 2009, Jakobsen made his debut for the senior Denmark national football team.

Honours 
Melbourne City
 FFA Cup: 2016

Adelaide United
 FFA Cup: 2018 and 2019

Individual

2002 Danish Under-17 Player of the Year
Danish Superliga: 2007–08 and 2012–13

References

External links 

Michael Jakobsen on DBU 
Michael Jakobsen on Esbjerg fB 

1986 births
Living people
Footballers from Copenhagen
Danish men's footballers
Association football defenders
Boldklubben af 1893 players
Eredivisie players
PSV Eindhoven players
Danish Superliga players
AaB Fodbold players
F.C. Copenhagen players
FC Nordsjælland players
La Liga players
UD Almería players
Eliteserien players
Lillestrøm SK players
Melbourne City FC players
Adelaide United FC players
NorthEast United FC players
A-League Men players
Denmark youth international footballers
Denmark under-21 international footballers
Denmark international footballers
Danish expatriate men's footballers
Expatriate footballers in the Netherlands
Expatriate footballers in Spain
Expatriate footballers in Norway
Danish expatriate sportspeople in the Netherlands
Danish expatriate sportspeople in Spain
Danish expatriate sportspeople in Norway
Danish expatriate sportspeople in Australia